In computing, Native capacity refers to the uncompressed storage capacity of any medium that is usually spoken of in compressed sizes. For example, tape cartridges are rated in compressed capacity, which usually assumes 2:1 compression ratio over the native capacity.

References

Computer storage media